Ronaldus Cornelis "Ron" Stevens (born 15 February 1959 in Lienden, Gelderland) is a Dutch sprint canoeist who competed in the early to mid-1980s. He won a silver in the K-2 10000 m event at the 1982 ICF Canoe Sprint World Championships in Belgrade.

Stevens also competed in two Summer Olympics, earning his best finish of seventh in the K-2 1000 m event at Moscow in 1980.

References
 
 
 

1959 births
Living people
Sportspeople from Buren
Canoeists at the 1980 Summer Olympics
Canoeists at the 1984 Summer Olympics
Dutch male canoeists
Olympic canoeists of the Netherlands
ICF Canoe Sprint World Championships medalists in kayak
20th-century Dutch people